Mount Alvernia High School was a private, all-girls, Roman Catholic high school in Pittsburgh, Pennsylvania; it is within the Diocese of Pittsburgh. The school was closed in June 2011 due to declining enrollment.

History
Mount Alvernia High School was established in 1936 and is located on the grounds of the Franciscan Sisters of Millvale.

References

Defunct schools in Pennsylvania
Defunct Catholic secondary schools in Pennsylvania
Educational institutions established in 1936
Educational institutions disestablished in 2011
Girls' schools in Pennsylvania
1936 establishments in Pennsylvania